Hiscock is a surname. Notable people with the surname include:

 Dave Hiscock (born 1953), New Zealand motorcycle racer
 Eileen Hiscock (1909–1958), British athlete
 Eric Hiscock (1908–1986), British sailor and author
 Frank Hiscock (1834–1914), American politician
 Frank H. Hiscock (1856–1946), American lawyer and judge
 Neville Hiscock (1951–1983), New Zealand motorcycle racer
 Thomas Hiscock (1812–1855), English blacksmith and prospector

See also
 Hiscock Site, archaeological dig site in Byron, New York, United States